The 1969 PGA Tour season was played from January 9 to December 7. The season consisted of 49 official money events. Billy Casper, Raymond Floyd, Dave Hill, and Jack Nicklaus won the most tournaments, three each, and there were 14 first-time winners. Frank Beard was the leading money winner with earnings of $164,707. Orville Moody was voted the PGA Player of the Year and Dave Hill won the Vardon Trophy for the lowest scoring average.

This is generally regarded as the first season of an independent PGA Tour. The tour began to break off from the PGA of America in August 1968. The players formed a Tournament Players Division within the PGA of America, "a freestanding corporation run by a 10-member tournament policy board of four players, three PGA executives and three consulting businessmen."

Schedule
The following table lists official events during the 1969 season.

Unofficial events
The following events were sanctioned by the PGA Tour, but did not carry official money, nor were wins official.

Money leaders
The money list was based on prize money won during the season, calculated in U.S. dollars.

Awards

Notes

References

External links
PGA Tour official site

PGA Tour seasons
PGA Tour